Pseudopaludicola ceratophyes is a species of frog in the family Leptodactylidae. Common name Leticia swamp frog has been coined for it, after its type locality, Leticia in Amazonas, Colombia. It is found in extreme southernmost Colombia (the type locality), northeastern Peru (Loreto Region), and adjacent western Brazil.

Description
The holotype, a gravid female, measured  in snout–vent length. The upper eyelids carry horn-like, elongate tubercles. The toes are approximately ⅓ webbed; the unwebbed portions bear lateral fringes.

Habitat and conservation
Pseudopaludicola ceratophyes is a locally abundant leaf-litter species inhabiting primary flooding forest with close canopy, possibly also more open/edge areas. The eggs are deposited in shallow pools. It is locally affected by habitat loss.

References

ceratophyes
Amphibians of Brazil
Amphibians of Colombia
Amphibians of Peru
Taxa named by Marco Antonio Serna Díaz
Taxa named by Juan A. Rivero
Taxonomy articles created by Polbot
Amphibians described in 1985